Söğütözü is a village in the Erzincan District of Erzincan Province in Turkey with an elevation of 890 metres.

References

Villages in Erzincan District